The 2019 Halle Open (known for sponsorship reasons as the 2019 Noventi Open) was a tennis tournament played on outdoor grass courts. It was the 27th edition of the Halle Open and part of the ATP Tour 500 series of the 2019 ATP Tour. It took place at the Gerry Weber Stadion in Halle, Germany, between 17 June and 23 June 2019.

Points and prize money

Point distribution

Prize money 

*per team

ATP singles main draw entrants

Seeds

1 Rankings are as of June 10, 2019.

Other entrants
The following players received wildcards into the main draw:
  Peter Gojowczyk
  Rudolf Molleker
  Jo-Wilfried Tsonga

The following players received entry from the qualifying draw:
  Mats Moraing
  Andreas Seppi
  João Sousa
  Sergiy Stakhovsky

The following player received entry as a lucky loser:
  Miomir Kecmanović

Withdrawals
Before the tournament
  Pablo Carreño Busta → replaced by  Jaume Munar
  Kei Nishikori → replaced by  Miomir Kecmanović
  Dominic Thiem → replaced by  Taylor Fritz

Retirements
  Borna Ćorić

ATP doubles main draw entrants

Seeds

1 Rankings are as of June 10, 2019.

Other entrants
The following pairs received wildcards into the doubles main draw:
  Dustin Brown /  Tim Pütz
  Alexander Zverev /  Mischa Zverev

The following pair received entry from the qualifying draw:
  Marcelo Demoliner /  Divij Sharan

The following pair received entry as lucky losers:
  Matthew Ebden /  Denis Kudla

Withdrawals
Before the tournament
  Alexander Zverev

Champions

Singles

  Roger Federer def.  David Goffin, 7–6(7–2), 6–1

Doubles

  Raven Klaasen /  Michael Venus def.  Łukasz Kubot /  Marcelo Melo, 4–6, 6–3, [10–4]

References

External links 
 Official website